The Lola B02/00 is a highly successful open-wheel racing car chassis designed and built by Lola that competed in the CART (and later Champ Car) series, between 2002 and 2006. It was extremely competitive and incredibly dominant chassis; going on to win 4 constructors' titles, 4 drivers' titles, and claiming a total of 73 race wins over four seasons. It was eventually succeeded by the Panoz DP01 chassis in 2007.

References 

Open wheel racing cars
American Championship racing cars
Lola racing cars